Huijong of Goryeo (21 June 1181 – 31 August 1237, r. 1204–1211) was the 21st Monarch of the Goryeo dynasty of Korea.

It is said of Huijong that if he were to have grown old he would have made a great King. When his father ascended to the throne and Huijong became Crown Prince, he rebelled against Choe Chungheon, the military leader of that time, and his younger brother Choe Chungsu. Huijong grew truly hostile towards them after Chungsu forced the Crown Princess to abdicate so that he could replace her with his daughter. During the rebellion, Huijong masterminded a plan to make Chungheon kill Chungsu, but Chungheon found out about it. Huijong was forced to beg for forgiveness and humble himself before one of his own subjects, which only made him hungrier for revenge.

When King Sinjong fell ill in 1204, he stepped down from the throne to let his son Huijong be King. Huijong, knowing that he had to lull Choe Chungheon into a false sense of security in order to be able to kill him, promoted him to Prime Minister of the State. This title was the one most often given out during the time of military rule to people such as Jeong Jung-bu, Yi Ui-min, and even Chungheon's father posthumously. Huijong also named Chungheon the Royal Protector, the greatest honor of the time, which was usually only given to relatives of the King. With these two titles, Choe Chungheon had political power nearly equal to that of the King himself. He used it to obliterate three rebellions, one led by his slave, another by Silla partisans, and one by his nephew Park Jinjae.

As Chungheon became secure in his new position, however, Huijong began to make preparations. Claiming illness, he tricked Choe Chungheon into coming alone into the palace without his usual host of guards. Once he arrived, Huijong attempted a coup d'état against him. Unfortunately, this failed and Choe Chungheon barely escaped with his life. Enraged, he exiled King Huijong. Chungheon had realized by this time that he held the 'power of the heavens' in his hand, and could crown and exile whomever he wished whenever he wished. King Gangjong was crowned in Huijong's place.

Family
Father: Sinjong of Goryeo (고려 신종)
Grandfather: Injong of Goryeo (고려 인종)
Grandmother: Queen Gongye (공예왕후)
Mother: Queen Seonjeong (선정왕후)
Grandfather: Wang On, Duke Gangneung (왕온 강릉공)
Grandmother: Lady Gim (부인 김씨)
Consorts and their Respective issue(s):
Deposed Crown Princess consort, of the Gaeseong Wang clan (폐태자비 왕씨); third cousin once removed – No issue.
Queen Seongpyeong of the Jangheung Im clan (성평왕후 임씨; d. 1247); fifth cousin.
Wang Ji, Duke Changwon (왕지 창원공)
Wang Wi, Marquess Siryeong (왕위 시령후)
Wang Jo, Duke Gyeongwon (왕조 경원공)
Wang Gyeong-ji (왕경지)
Wang Gak-eung (왕각응)
Princess Seungbok (승복궁주)
Princess Yeongchang (영창공주)
Princess Deokchang (덕창궁주)
Princess Gasun (가순궁주)
Princess Jeonghui (정희궁주)

Popular culture
Portrayed by Jung Tae-woo in the 2003-2004 KBS TV series Age of Warriors.

See also
 History of Korea
 List of Korean rulers
 List of Goryeo people

References

 

13th-century Korean monarchs
1181 births
1237 deaths